The Western Sydney Derby is the rivalry between the Parramatta Eels and the Penrith Panthers in the National Rugby League.

History
Parramatta entered the NSWRL now NRL competition in 1947, meanwhile Penrith entered 20 years later in 1967.  Parramatta are the closest NRL team to Penrith geographically. 

Former Penrith and current Parramatta player Reagan Campbell-Gillard spoke about Penrith and Parramatta saying "As a Penrith junior, you come through the system to hate them. “I also don't like that word but it is. It doesn't matter what form you're in, it's a game you get up for".

In 2002, Parramatta thrashed the Penrith 64–6, this coming after a season in which Parramatta finished first on the ladder and Penrith last. But they would not meet again until Round 26, 2003, when Penrith, in front of a then-record crowd defeated Parramatta 40–22 denying the Eels a place in the finals (Parramatta had to win by 28+ points). Penrith went on to win the premiership that year. Round 17, 2009 saw a Penrith win by 38–34 in which the lead changed several times, before Parramatta recorded a huge 48–6 win in the penultimate round of the 2009 NRL season.

In the 2010 NRL season, Parramatta came from 22–0 down at half-time against Penrith to win 34–28 at Penrith Park with Parramatta player Jarryd Hayne starring with a man of the match performance.

Since Penrith entered the competition in 1967, the two clubs have played each other five times in the finals.  The last being the 2022 NRL Grand Final which Penrith won 28-12.  In round 5 of the 2020 NRL season, Parramatta came back from a 10–0 deficit at the 61st minute to beat Penrith 16–10, that would be Penrith's only loss in the 2020 NRL regular season that year as Penrith finished as minor premiers.

In round 9 of the 2022 NRL season, Parramatta defeated Penrith 22-20 at Penrith Park. It was Penrith's first loss of the season and it also ended  the clubs 21-match winning streak at the ground.  Parramatta were the only team to defeat Penrith twice in the 2022 NRL season. The two teams met twice in the finals series, with Penrith winning both matches en route to their second consecutive premiership.

Results

Overall

As of 5 September 2021

Overall in NRL

As of 9 March 2023

NRL results

Finals series
This table only shows competitive finals series matches.

NRL Nines
Playing in the NRL Nines does not count as a senior first grade appearance.

Statistics

Most appearances

Top pointscorers

Top tryscorers

Attendances
Highest attendance:
Parramatta Eels at home: 54,833 – Parramatta 40 – 4 Penrith, Round 1, 2001, ANZ Stadium
Penrith Panthers at home: 22,582 – Penrith 28 – 34 Parramatta, Round 19, 2010, Penrith Stadium
Lowest attendance:
Parramatta Eels at home: 507 – Parramatta 16 – 10 Penrith, Round 5, 2020, Bankwest Stadium (Attendances impacted by COVID-19)
Penrith Panthers at home: 3,870 – Penrith 24 – 16 Parramatta, Round 22, 1996, Penrith Stadium

See also

Rivalries in the National Rugby League

References

External links

Parramatta Eels
Penrith Panthers
Rugby league rivalries
Rugby league club matches
Rugby league in Sydney
Recurring sporting events established in 1967
1967 establishments in Australia
Sports rivalries in Australia